Crazyhorse Mongoose is the second studio album by the New Orleans, LA-based band Galactic.

The album reached No. 24 on the Billboard Top Contemporary Jazz Albums chart.

Critical reception
The Deseret News wrote that the album "solidified the band's reputation of being a great foot-stomping groove band."

Track listing
All tracks by Galactic

 "Hamp's Hump" – 3:45
 "Love on the Run" – 5:45
 "Crazyhorse Mongoose" – 4:47
 "Witch Doctor" – 4:13
 "Metermaid" – 1:37
 "Change My Ways (Pt. 1)" – 1:38
 "Change My Ways (Pt. 2)" – 4:22
 "Denny's Village Rundown" – 2:30
 "Tighten Your Wig" – 3:11
 "Cafe DeClouet" – 0:21
 "Start from Scratch" – 4:12
 "Quiet Please" – 20:55

Personnel
Galactic:
Theryl DeClouet - vocals
Ben Ellman - baritone, tenor saxophone
Jason Mingledorff - alto, tenor saxophone
Robert Mercurio - bass, vocals, photography
Stanton Moore - drums, loops
Richard Vogel - keyboards
Jeff Raines - guitar
Dan Prothero - producer, engineer, graphic design, mixing

References

External links
 Official Galactic site
 Fog City Productions

1998 albums
Galactic albums
Capricorn Records albums